KBFX-CD (channel 58) is a low-power, Class A television station in Bakersfield, California, United States, affiliated with the Fox network. It is owned by Sinclair Broadcast Group alongside CBS affiliate KBAK-TV (channel 29). Both stations share studios on Westwind Drive west of Downtown Bakersfield, while KBFX's transmitter is located atop Breckenridge Mountain.

In addition to its own digital signal, KBFX-CD is simulcast in high definition on KBAK's second digital subchannel (58.2) from the same transmitter site.

History
KBFX signed on November 1, 1990, as K58DJ, a low-powered relay translator of KMPH, Fresno's Fox affiliate. It changed its call letters to KMPH-LP in 1995. Later, the Fox network wanted to include a new separate affiliate station for the Bakersfield market; as a result, in 1998, channel 58 was relaunched as KBFX-LP. Among the features on the new station was a KBAK-produced 10 p.m. newscast, "Fox 58 News @ 10". It was so successful that KBAK's then-owner Westwind Communications bought the station in 2005 from KMPH's owners, Pappas Telecasting.

On August 6, 2007, Westwind Communications announced the sale of KBAK and KBFX-CA to Fisher Communications of Seattle, with the sale closing on January 1, 2008.

On February 28, 2010, Bright House Networks (now Spectrum) announced that KBFX will be carried in Tehachapi on cable channel 6.

In January 2011, KBFX began airing its local news in high definition.

Fisher Communications announced on April 11, 2013, that it would be acquired by Sinclair Broadcast Group, pending Federal Communications Commission (FCC) approval. The deal was completed on August 8, 2013. On October 3, 2013, Sinclair announced the completion of the sale of four stations owned by Titan TV Broadcast Group, including KMPH, which reunites KBFX as sister-stations for the first time in eight years.

KBFX is the only Bakersfield television station to never change its affiliation, having always been a Fox affiliate.

Technical information

Subchannels
The station's digital signal is multiplexed:

The analog signal went off the air in August 2010. KBFX just recently launched their new digital transmitter on RF channel 29. This signal carried This TV on its subchannel, which maps to virtual channel 29-2.

The station's 29.2 subchannel was an initial affiliate of the American Sports Network with its first broadcast on August 30, 2014.

Notes

References

External links

BFX-CD
Low-power television stations in the United States
Fox network affiliates
Comet (TV network) affiliates
Sinclair Broadcast Group
Pappas Telecasting
Television channels and stations established in 1990
1990 establishments in California